Constantinescu (or Constantinesco, its Francisized version), is a common Romanian family name.

It may refer to one of the following:
Alecu Constantinescu (1872-1949), Romanian journalist and communist activist
Alexandru Constantinescu-Porcu (1859–1926), Romanian politician, and his son Ata Constantinescu, politician and political prisoner
Constantin Constantinescu-Claps (1884–1961), Romanian General
Emil Constantinescu (born 1939), Romanian professor and politician, former President of Romania 1996-2000
George Constantinescu (1881–1965), Romanian scientist and inventor
Ion Constantinescu (1896-????), Romanian Brigadier-General
Liviu Constantinescu (1914–1997), Romanian geophysicist
Marian Constantinescu (born 1981), Romanian footballer
Miron Constantinescu (1917–1974), Romanian sociologist, historian, and communist politician
Mitiță Constantinescu (1890-1946), Romanian economist and politician
Nicu Constantinescu (1840-1905), Romanian liberal politician, former mayor of Buzău
Ovidiu Constantinescu (1933-2012), Romanian mycologist
Paul Constantinescu (1909-1963), Romanian composer
Pompiliu Constantinescu (1901–1946), Romanian literary historian and critic
Ștefan Constantinescu (born 1968), Swedish-Romanian visual artist and film director, painter
Tancred Constantinescu (1878–1951), Romanian general and politician
Vladimir Constantinescu (1895-1965), Romanian Major-General

See also
Constantinesco (automobile)

Romanian-language surnames
Patronymic surnames
Surnames from given names